This list includes characters from the original Beyblade series.

Main characters

The main protagonist of Beyblade. Master of sacred bit-beast Dragoon.

A cold-hearted and ruthless Russian beyblader. Tyson's fated rival, and through many hardships and Beyblading, they eventually develop a strong friendship and respect for each other. The grandson of Voltaire Hiwatari. Master of sacred bit-beast Dranzer

A happy, good-natured American kid who always sees the best in everything and everyone. Master of sacred bit-beast Draciel

A level headed, balanced member of the Bladebreakers from China. He used to be leader of White Tiger. He is a neko-jin from fang tribe and master of sacred bit-beast Drigger

Also known as the Chief, is the brains of the Bladebreakers team, a self-described nerd due to his advanced expertise on beyblading and computer technology, as well as an expert on every aspect of the sport. He has bit beast in his laptop named Dizzy.

A beyblader who joins Tyson's team in Beyblade G-Revolution after the Bladebreakers are dissolved. Master of Strata Dragoon.

Supporting characters

Kai's grandfather and the true mastermind behind BIOVOLT Corporation.

A criminal mastermind who is the overall series antagonist seeking world dominion through Beyblade. He appears in the first season as Voltaire's accomplice under the cover of the Demolition Boys' trainer, running an Abbey as a front to select ideal beybladers while disposing of those who fail to live up to his standards while also utilizing unorthodox enhancements on them and their bit beasts. Boris escapes capture after Voltaire's criminal activities were exposed. Boris resurfaces during the events of G-Revolution, claiming to have reformed while establishing the BEGA League for his agenda before his plans were ultimately ruined.

The leader of the Saint Shields.

A member of the Saint Shields.

A member of the Saint Shields and Joseph's older sister.

A member of the Saint Shields and Mariam's younger brother.

The twin brother of Queen.

The sister brother of King.

Zeo's father and the CEO of Zagart Industries. He is trying to steal the four sacred beasts of the Bladebreakers in order to convert Zeo into a real boy.

The overseer of Team Psykick and the one who thought of the Cyber Bit-Beast project.

The head scientist of Team Psykick.

A scientist that worked for Dr. Zagart before being fired for her disloyalty in handing over the extracted bit-beasts from the sacred rock she stole from Zagart.

Zeo's partner in the Beyblade World Championships.

The coach of the Barthez Battalion, which is named after him.

The leader of the BEGA League.

A member of the BEGA League and the leader of Justice Five.

A member of the BEGA League.

A member of the BEGA League.

A member of the BEGA League.

Tyson and Kenny's classmate, as well as the class president, often frustrated with trying to get Tyson to do his work. She is tomboyish and known for her violent temper. Though she is hard on Tyson sometimes, it has been hinted that Hilary has a crush on Tyson. The pairing is supported by anime characters such as Dizzi and Ray's Sensei

Tyson's older brother and an extremely strong talented beyblader and an extraordinary Coach. He is master of all 4 bit beasts of metal series.

The leader of the White Tigers and Mariah's brother.

A member of the White Tigers and Lee's sister.

A member of the White Tigers.

A member of the White Tigers.

Leader of the All-Starz.

A new member of the All-Starz, replacing Stevens due to injury in G-Revolution.

A member of the All-Starz.

A member of the All-Starz.

A member of the All-Starz. In G-Revolution, he is replaced by Rick due to injury.

Max's mother, a researcher/scientist of the BBA, and the All Starz coach.

The unofficial leader of the Dark Bladers and Lupinex's older brother.

A member of the Dark Bladers and Sanguinex's little brother.

A member of the Dark Bladers.

A member of the Dark Bladers.

Team captain of the Majestics.

A member of the Majestics as the Blader for Scotland, and is known as the "Gladiator of Glasgow".

A member of the Majestics, representing Italy.

The Beyblading champion of France and a member of the Majestics.

The captain of the Demolition Boys.

A member of the Demolition Boys.

A member of the Demolition Boys.

A member of the Demolition Boys.

The former leader of Team Psykick.

A former member of Team Psykick.

A former member of Team Psykick.

A former member of Team Psykick.

A member of the Bladebreakers temporarily and later, Team Zagart.

A member of F-Dynasty and Raul's older twin sister.

A member of F-Dynasty and Julia's younger twin brother.

F-Dynasty's coach.

Captain of Barthez Battalion.

A member of Barthez Battalion.

A member of Barthez Battalion.

A member of Barthez Battalion.

Other characters

The BBA's top announcer and gives the signal to start every battle. He introduces the players and announces where the next tournament will take place.

The black scientist that Kenny meets after watching Ray train for his battle with Tyson in Volume 2. He and Jin create the Spin-Gear system, which is first used by Ray Kon, and he makes Kenny create a left-spin gear in order to create Dragoon S. During the "Bakuten Shoot V Saga" in the manga, he gives Ray and Max the "Magnacore". His rival is Tyson's brother Hiro, as they are both into the deep secrets of beyblading and the Holy Monster series.  However, they work together quite well.

A skilled beyblader and swordsman. He has a younger brother named Tenmaru and his bit-beast is Guardian Driger. Tenmaru usually helps Kennosuke train in swordsmanship. After an encounter with Daichi and a thief, Daichi desires to battle Kennosuke, who refuses.  However, after Daichi's Gaia Dragoon almost injures him in a training accident, Kennosuke quickly accepts the challenge and he easily overpowers Daichi.  After some harsh training, Daichi demands a rematch, which Kennosuke initially refuses, but later accepts after seeing the blisters on Daichi's hands, a result of his rigorous training. Kennosuke is defeated and resolves to work more on developing his beyblading skills.

During the qualifications of the GBC, Kennosuke battles against Takao, but loses. When Daichi partakes in a 100-battle challenge, Kennosuke returns, not as Daichi's opponent, but to support Tenmaru in his battle as Daichi's 100th opponent. When Daichi becomes annoyed at Tenmaru for constantly asking for rematches, Daichi becomes the "Kennosuke" of the Daichi-Kennosuke relationship when they first meet. Kennosuke returns a final time to support Daichi in his and Tyson's match against the Demolition Boys. He also appears briefly in the series-ending slideshow ("Kaze No Fuku Basho").

Kennosuke's little brother, who helps him train in beyblading and swordsmanship. His beyblade is Thunder Dragon and he is first seen battling against Daichi as his 100th opponent. Angered by his loss, Tenmaru eagerly looks forward to a rematch, but Daichi refuses, with Tenmaru becoming the "Daichi" of the Daichi-Kennosuke relationship. He appears in the series-ending slideshow with Kennosuke.

Hikaru is a young beyblader who comes from a wealthy family.  His bit-beast is Spike Lizard and his beyblade is equipped with rollers for evasiveness and camouflage paint.  He often has a group of fangirls that follow him around and cheer him on.  He first meets Daichi when his little brother borrows his beyblade and then has it stolen by a Daichi impersonator.  Hikaru witnesses Daichi's battle with the impersonator and stops him from running away with all the stolen beyblades.  Afterward, he invites Daichi back to his mansion for a battle.

During his battle with Daichi, Hikaru loses, but the wings of Daichi's Gaia Dragoon break off.  It turns out that Hikaru knows the Chief through the Internet.  After Daichi repairs his beyblade, but is unable to activate the wings, Hikaru challenges Daichi to another match.

During the GBC qualifications, Hikaru loses to Kai Hiwatari.  Hikaru returns to cheer Daichi on in the final match.  He appears in the series-ending slideshow with Kennosuke and Tenmaru.

Son of Tyson.

Son of Kai.

Daughter of Ray and Mariah.

References

Beyblade